Taj Mahal is a 2008 Indian Kannada-language romantic drama film directed and written by R. Chandru and starring Ajay Rao and Pooja Gandhi. Produced by T. Shivashankar Reddy, the film is Chandru's directoral debut. The film opened on 25 July 2008, and had a 200-day run in Karanataka.  Music director Abhiman Roy was awarded the Best Music Director accolade at the Karnataka State Film Awards for his film score. Taj Mahal was one of the most successful Kannada-language films of 2008. It was remade in Telugu under the same title - Taj Mahal in 2010.

Plot
Ajaykumar, an honest, poor boy from a village, hands over a lost suitcase to the police. He tells them that his name is Kumar and leaves his cell number. Shruthi, the owner of the suitcase, is elated when she recovers her father's suitcase, and calls Kumar to thank him.

They speak over the phone many times and slowly fall in love. Incidentally they both study in the same engineering college, but Shruthi knows her lover only as Kumar. In college he is known as Ajay. Shruthi is not aware that Ajay and Kumar are the same person and flatly rejects Ajay when he proposes to her. In confusion and deep agony, Ajay decides to finish his engineering and go back to his village but on the examination day he gets a call from Shruthi.

Production

Sunil Raoh was asked to play the lead but backed out, citing personal reasons. Ajay Rao, who had one successful role in the film Excuse Me, replaced Raoh. Taj Mahals success enhanced Rao's career.

Upon the film's release, some viewers called Chandru, accusing him of basing the film on their lives. Chandru dismissed these claims and stated that the film was based on events in a friend's life.

Cast
 Ajay Rao as Ajay
 Pooja Gandhi as Shruti
 Ananth Nag as Shruthi's father
 Ashok 
 Rangayana Raghu as Shankranna 
 Vishwanath Mundasada
 Honnavalli Krishna
 Aravind
 Padmaja Rao
 Padmini Prakash
 K. Annamalai (I.P.S)

Soundtrack
The music of the film was composed by Abhiman Roy. The soundtrack won him the Karnataka State Film Award for Best Music Director for 2008-09.

Critical response
Rediff.com awarded the film 3.5 stars out of 5, writing, "Taj Mahal blends pure romance with a right portion of sentiment and a bit of humour. And it is ably complemented by its excellent music and brilliant cinematography. The film also underlines the importance of parents' contribution to the future of their children, and how such an important factor is missed out by today's youngsters... Performance-wise, Ajay has come out with his best till date. The actor, who made a very good first impression with Prem's Excuse Me, has bounced back with this powerful performance. Pooja Gandhi looks stunning and has worked hard to give a very strong performance."

indiaglitz.com rated the film 7.5 out of 10 and stated that Ajay Rao "has done his role quite comfortably. Pooja Gandhi the heroine to watch on Kannada screen has been very good in emotions."

Sify rated the film 4 out of 5 and wrote that Rao "has done it impressively and he is looking for a major breakthrough. Pooja Gandhi looks pretty and has done a good job. Suresh Mangalore Rangayana Raghu and Ananthnag are apt."

Box office

The film was released in Karnataka and completed a 200-day theatrical run.

Awards and nominations

Awards

References

External links
 List of Taj Mahal songs at Raaga.com
 

2008 films
2000s Kannada-language films
2008 romantic drama films
Kannada films remade in other languages
Indian romantic drama films
Films directed by R. Chandru
2008 directorial debut films
Films scored by Abhimann Roy